Robert Todd (September 24,1963– August 18, 2018) was an American filmmaker, known primarily for his short poetic experimental films. He was a beloved Professor in the Film Department at Emerson College. His films have screened at international film festivals including The Rotterdam International Film Festival, The New York Film Festival, The Ann Arbor Film Festival, Media City Festival, and others.

Films 
Todd worked in a variety of genres including drama, traditional documentary, creative nonfiction and used techniques such as lyrical abstraction, and structural experimentation. His films have been compared to lyrical filmmakers as Nathaniel Dorsky and Peter Hutton. They have been described as intimate and personal.

Since 1999 he worked nearly exclusively in 16mm. In addition to his short films, he produced long format documentaries which included In Loving Memory: In Loving Memory: Testimonials of Death Row Inmates Regarding Life”  (2005), and Master Plan (2011) which links incarceration with general issues of housing in America. In the past few years he exhibited works in expanded cinema contexts, creating works for performance with musicians at festivals and other venues.

Two of Todd's films, Fantasies and Matters of Life and Death, were preserved by the Academy Film Archive in 2019.

Awards 
Todd received grants and awards from numerous festivals and foundations internationally, including the LEF Foundation, The Brother Thomas Award from The Boston Foundation, and the Massachusetts Cultural Council.

Death 
On August 18, 2018, Todd died by suicide.

References

1963 births
2018 deaths
American filmmakers
People from Boston
Emerson College faculty